Seyon may refer to:

Amda Seyon (usurper), the Emperor of Ethiopia for less than one month
Amda Seyon I of Ethiopia, Emperor of Ethiopia (1314–1344), and a member of the Solomonic dynasty
Amda Seyon II (1487–1494), Emperor of Ethiopia and a member of the Solomonic dynasty
Egwale Seyon of Ethiopia (died 1818), or Gwalu (ጓሉ) was nəgusä nägäst (1801–1818), of Ethiopia, and a member of the Solomonic dynasty
Yagbe'u Seyon of Ethiopia was (18 June 1285 – 1294) of Ethiopia, and a member of the Solomonic dynasty
Suriyakumaran Seyon, born on (06.06.1999), Jaffna, Sri Lanka

See also
Sons of Yagbe'u Seyon of Ethiopia